Canas is one of the 31 barrios in the municipality of Ponce, Puerto Rico.  Along with Anón, Coto Laurel, Guaraguao, Quebrada Limón, Real, San Patricio, and Marueño, and the coastal barrio of Capitanejo, Canas is one of the municipality's nine bordering barrios.  It borders the municipality of Peñuelas. Along with Playa, Bucana, Vayas and Capitanejo, Canas is also one of Ponce's five coastal barrios. It was founded in 1831.

Location
Canas is a suburban and partly mountainous barrio located in the southern section of the municipality, west of the city of Ponce, at latitude 18.000283N, and longitude -66.658800 W.

Name

According to Sunny A. Cabrera Salcedo in this Ph.D. dissertation, the name is of native Indian origin. However, according to famed Puerto Rican historian Eduardo Neumann Gandia, the name Canas comes from Palma Cana, a palm useful for making sombreros, which was very abundant in the territory of Barrio Canas. Ivette Perez Vega de Soler states that Canas, more than any other barrio in Ponce, had extensive areas of "palmares de yaguas". The barrio formed from a community of tobacco plant growers dating back to the 1680s.

Boundaries
It is bounded on the North by the hills north of Camino Bello Road, the hills north of PR-132, and Clavel Street, on the South by the Caribbean Sea, on the West by the El Peñón de Ponce promontory, the hills west of Correccional Las Cucharas Street, and the hills west of PR-549, and on the East by the hills west of PR-123, the future western branch of PR-9, Río Pastillo (roughly) and Río Matilde (roughly).

In terms of barrio-to-barrio boundaries, Canas is bounded in the North by the Quebrada Limón and Portugués, in the South by the Caribbean Sea, in the West by the barrios of Encarnacion, Tallaboa Saliente, and Tallaboa Alta of the municipality of Peñuelas, and in the East by Magueyes, Magueyes Urbano, Canas Urbano, and Playa.

Features and demographics

Canas is divided into three subbarrios according to the U.S. Census Bureau: Baldorioty de Castro, Clausells, and Reparada.  The northern portion of Canas is home to the communities of Quebrada del Agua, Mansiones del Sur, Pastillo Alto, Villa Paraiso, Jardines del Caribe, Villa Delicias, Casa Mia, Villas del Caribe, Valle Alegre, and Quintas del Sur, while the southern section is host to La Cotorra, Baramaya, Bello Horizonte, Las Margaritas, La Matilde, Punto Oro, Punta Diamante, El Tuque, Nueva Vida, Las Batatas, Brisas del Caribe, and Las Cucharas.

In 2000, the population of Canas was 34,065 persons, and it had a density of 2,349 persons per square mile. Canas, has the distinction of being the most populated barrio in the municipality of Ponce. It also has the longest coastline of all barrios in Ponce.

In 2010, the population of Canas was 32,708 persons, and it had a density of 2,260.4 persons per square mile.

Major roads in barrio Canas are PR-2, PR-132, PR-500, and PR-549.

The highest point in Barrio Canas stands at 918 feet and is located at the northernmost tip of the barrio. Another notable land feature is the Penon de Ponce promontory near the shoreline which stands at 331 feet.

Notable landmarks
Barrio Canas is home to Salinas Lagoon, a natural reserve. El Tuque Beach is also located in Barrio Canas.

The Francisco Parra Duperón school is located in this barrio.

See also

 List of communities in Puerto Rico

Notes

References

External links

Populated coastal places in Puerto Rico
1831 establishments in Puerto Rico
Barrio Canas